Leigh Meghan Kasperek (born 15 February 1992) is a Scottish cricketer who plays internationally for the New Zealand national team. She previously played for the Scottish national side, but switched to New Zealand in order to play at a higher level.

Scotland career
Born in Edinburgh, Kasperek made her senior national debut at the age of 15, playing for Scotland against English county sides in the 2007 County Challenge Cup. Her international debut came later in the year, when she appeared against Ireland and the Netherlands at the European Championship. Early in 2008, Kasperek was selected in Scotland's squad for the 2008 World Cup Qualifier in South Africa. She went on to play in four out of a possible five matches, but had little success, scoring only four runs and failing to take a wicket from her ten overs, while conceding 57 runs.

Over the next few years, Kasperek firmly established herself as one of Scotland's leading all-rounders. One of her first notable performances came against Hampshire in the 2009 edition of the County Championship, when she took 3/2 from six overs to help bowl the side out for 76. Later in the year, against the Netherlands at the 2009 European Championship, she scored a maiden half-century for Scotland, making 58 from 106 balls (including a 135-run partnership with Kari Anderson). During the 2010 County Championship season, Kasperek scored 218 runs from her ten matches, behind only Kathryn White for Scotland. Her best performance was an innings of 68 against Hampshire, which was her only half-century.

Overseas experience
For the 2011–12 season, Kasperek signed for the Western Fury, a team in Australia's Women's National Cricket League (WNCL), also playing club cricket for Midland-Guildford. For the 2012 County Championship season, she switched from Scotland to Essex, although later in the year she did play one final international tournament, the European Twenty20 Qualifier in Ireland. Having been named Essex's player of the year, later in the year Kasperek signed for the Wellington Blaze, which plays in the New Zealand State League.

In 2022, Kasperek signed for Northern Diamonds as an overseas player for the upcoming season. She played 13 matches for the side that season, across the Charlotte Edwards Cup and the Rachael Heyhoe Flint Trophy, taking 14 wickets.

New Zealand career
Kasperek had little success in her first season in New Zealand, with her eight matches yielding only 86 runs and a single wicket. For the 2013–14 season, she switched to the Otago Sparks (based in Dunedin), and went on to score two half-centuries. Kasperek impressed more with her bowling, taking 18 wickets to finish as the competition's leading wicket-taker, including figures of 6/8 in one match against Canterbury. The next season, she returned 15 wickets to be Otago's leading wicket taker and equal-fourth in the competition, but also lifted her batting, scoring 313 runs to place behind only Suzie Bates for Otago (and tenth in the competition).

After three seasons in the New Zealand domestic competition, Kasperek met the ICC qualifications for representing the national team, although that had not been a specific goal of hers when she first moved there. In May 2015, she was unexpectedly named in the squad for the 2015 tour of India. Kasperek went on to play in every game on the tour, which comprised five One Day International (ODI) and three Twenty20 International matches. On debut in the first ODI, she took 3/39 from 10 overs. Later in 2015, against the touring Sri Lankans, Kasperek took 4/27, her maiden ODI four-wicket haul.

In a Twenty20 International against Australia in February 2016, Kasperek took 4/7 from three overs. Amy Satterthwaite is the only New Zealander to take better figures.

In August 2018, she was awarded a central contract by New Zealand Cricket, following the tours of Ireland and England in the previous months. In October 2018, she was named in New Zealand's squad for the 2018 ICC Women's World Twenty20 tournament in the West Indies. She was the leading wicket-taker for New Zealand in the tournament, with eight dismissals in four matches.

In January 2020, she was named in New Zealand's squad for the 2020 ICC Women's T20 World Cup in Australia.

During the 2nd WODI of the Australia tour of New Zealand in 2020-21, Kasperek took all bar one of the seven wickets to fall in the Australian innings, finishing with figures of 6/46 from 10 overs, the 17th best innings figures in Women's ODI history. She finished as the leading wicket taker in the ODI leg of the series with 9 wickets, despite playing only two of the three matches.

References

External links

 
 

1992 births
Living people
New Zealand cricketers
New Zealand women cricketers
New Zealand women One Day International cricketers
New Zealand women Twenty20 International cricketers
Scottish expatriates in Australia
Scottish expatriates in New Zealand
Scottish women cricketers
Cricketers from Edinburgh
Western Australia women cricketers
Wellington Blaze cricketers
Otago Sparks cricketers
Essex women cricketers
Yorkshire women cricketers
Yorkshire Diamonds cricketers
Northern Diamonds cricketers
IPL Velocity cricketers
Expatriate sportspeople in England